Yangang Station, formerly Jiangyan Lu Station, is a station on Guangfo Line. It is located under Gongye Avenue in the Haizhu District of Guangzhou. It entered operation on December 28, 2015.

Station layout

Exits

References

Guangzhou Metro stations in Haizhu District
Railway stations in China opened in 2015
Foshan Metro stations